Griggs County is a county in the U.S. state of North Dakota. As of the 2020 census, the population was 2,306. Its county seat is Cooperstown.

History
The county was created by the Dakota Territory legislature on February 18, 1881, with territories partitioned from Barnes, Foster, and Traill counties. It was not organized at that time, nor was it attached to another county for administrative or judicial purposes.  It was named for Alexander Griggs, a steamboat captain who is credited with founding Grand Forks.

The county organization was effected on June 16, 1882. Its boundary was altered in 1883 when Steele County was partitioned off; it has retained its present boundary since then.

Geography
The Sheyenne River flows southward through the east-central part of Griggs County, discharging into Lake Ashtabula at the county's SE corner. The county terrain consists of low rolling hills, dotted with lakes and ponds across its central part, mostly devoted to agriculture. The terrain slopes to the south and east; its highest point is a hill at its NW corner, at 1,562' (476m) ASL. It is the third-smallest county in North Dakota by land area and fourth-smallest by total area.

Major highways

  North Dakota Highway 1
  North Dakota Highway 45
  North Dakota Highway 65
  North Dakota Highway 200

Adjacent counties

 Nelson County (north)
 Steele County (east)
 Barnes County (south)
 Stutsman County (southwest)
 Foster County (west)
 Eddy County (northwest)

National protected area
 Sibley Lake National Wildlife Refuge

Lakes

 Hoot-E-Too Lake
 Jones Lake
 Lake Addie
 Lake Ashtabula (part)
 Lake Five
 Lake Jessie
 Lake Norway
 Lake Silver
 Long Lake
 Phelps Lake
 Pickerel Lake (part)
 Plum Lake
 Red Willow Lake
 Round Lake
 Rush Lake
 Sibley Lake

Demographics

2000 census
As of the 2000 census, there were 2,754 people, 1,178 households, and 781 families in the county. The population density was 4 people per square mile (2/km2). There were 1,521 housing units at an average density of 2 per square mile (1/km2). The racial makeup of the county was 99.31% White, 0.22% Native American, 0.15% Asian, 0.15% from other races, and 0.18% from two or more races. 0.40% of the population were Hispanic or Latino of any race. 59.7% were of Norwegian and 24.9% German ancestry.

There were 1,178 households, out of which 26.70% had children under the age of 18 living with them, 59.30% were married couples living together, 4.70% had a female householder with no husband present, and 33.70% were non-families. 31.60% of all households were made up of individuals, and 18.60% had someone living alone who was 65 years of age or older. The average household size was 2.29 and the average family size was 2.88.

The county population contained 22.50% under the age of 18, 4.90% from 18 to 24, 21.10% from 25 to 44, 25.80% from 45 to 64, and 25.70% who were 65 years of age or older. The median age was 46 years. For every 100 females there were 99.40 males. For every 100 females age 18 and over, there were 99.90 males.

The median income for a household in the county was $29,572, and the median income for a family was $38,611. Males had a median income of $26,981 versus $19,327 for females. The per capita income for the county was $16,131. About 7.80% of families and 10.10% of the population were below the poverty line, including 10.00% of those under age 18 and 10.30% of those age 65 or over.

2010 census
As of the 2010 census, there were 2,420 people, 1,131 households, and 694 families in the county. The racial makeup of the county was 98.8% white, 0.3% American Indian, 0.3% black or African American, 0.2% Asian, 0.2% from other races, and 0.2% from two or more races. Those of Hispanic or Latino origin made up 0.4% of the population. In terms of ancestry, 60.8% were Norwegian, 36.7% were German, 5.9% were English, 5.6% were Swedish, and 1.2% were American.

Of the 1,131 households, 20.8% had children under the age of 18 living with them, 53.9% were married couples living together, 4.2% had a female householder with no husband present, 38.6% were non-families, and 36.3% of all households were made up of individuals. The average household size was 2.10 and the average family size was 2.70. The median age was 51.9 years.

The median income for a household in the county was $40,085 and the median income for a family was $51,570. Males had a median income of $33,169 versus $27,038 for females. The per capita income for the county was $24,122. About 9.5% of families and 11.4% of the population were below the poverty line, including 11.4% of those under age 18 and 17.5% of those age 65 or over.

Communities

Cities

 Binford

 Cooperstown (county seat)
 Hannaford

Census-designated places
 Jessie
 Sutton

Unincorporated communities
 Karnak
 Walum
Mose

Townships

 Addie
 Ball Hill
 Bartley
 Broadview
 Bryan
 Clearfield
 Cooperstown
 Dover
 Greenfield
 Helena
 Kingsley
 Lenora
 Mabel
 Pilot Mound
 Romness
 Rosendal
 Sverdrup
 Tyrol
 Washburn
 Willow

Politics
Griggs County voters usually vote Republican. In only one national election since 1964 has the county selected the Democratic Party candidate.

Education
School districts include:
 Barnes County North Public School District 7
 Dakota Prairie Public School District 1
 Finley-Sharon Public School District 19
 Griggs County Central School District 18
 Hope-Page School District
 Midkota Public School District 7

Former:
 Hope Public School District 10 - Consolidated with Page district in 2020

See also
 National Register of Historic Places listings in Griggs County, North Dakota
 USS Griggs (APA-110), U.S. Navy ship named for this county

References

External links
 Griggs County map, North Dakota DOT

 
1882 establishments in Dakota Territory
Populated places established in 1882